This is a list of the 250 members of the 2008–2012 National Assembly of Serbia, as well as a list of former members of the 2008–2012 National Assembly.

The 2008–2012 National Assembly was elected in the 2008 parliamentary election, and it held its first session on 11 June 2008. The 2008–2012 National Assembly was the 8th assembly since the reestablishment of the multi-party system, after the 1990 parliamentary election.

MPs by party

List of members of the 8th National Assembly

List of former members of the 9th National Assembly

References

2008